Kalydon might mean:

 Calydon, ancient city in Aetolia, Greece
 Kalydon, uninhabited island area near the city of Elounda, Crete, Greece